Yadegar-e Ali Khvajeh may refer to:
 Yadegar-e Ali Khvajeh-ye Olya
 Yadegar-e Ali Khvajeh-ye Sofla